Rai Bahadur Sir Bipin Krishna Bose  (21 January 1851 – 26 August 1933) was an Indian advocate.

Bose started his law practice at Jubbulpore (now Jabalpur) in 1872, and moved to Nagpur, Central Provinces, in 1874. He was a member of the municipal committee and the boards of higher education institutions. He was appointed Government Advocate in 1888.

He was also Vice-Chancellor of Nagpur University. He was elected to the Council of India on 19 December 1903 as a non-official member representing the Central Provinces.

He was appointed Companion of the Order of the Indian Empire (CIE) in 1898, knighted in 1907, and appointed Knight Commander of the Order of the Indian Empire (KCIE) in the 1920 New Year Honours. He was awarded the  Kaisar-i-Hind Medal in the 1928 Birthday Honours for his services as vice-chancellor of Nagpur University.

Footnotes

References
Obituary, The Times, 28 August 1933

External links
 

1851 births
1933 deaths
19th-century Indian lawyers
Knights Commander of the Order of the Indian Empire
Knights Bachelor
Indian knights
Lawyers awarded knighthoods
Scholars from Nagpur
Members of the Council of India
20th-century Indian lawyers
Recipients of the Kaisar-i-Hind Medal